Randall is a city in Hamilton County, Iowa, United States. The population was 154 at the time of the 2020 census.

History
A post office called Randall has been in operation since 1863. The city was named for Samuel J. Randall, a member of the House of Representatives from Pennsylvania.

Geography
Randall is located at  (42.237408, -93.602532).

Demographics

2010 census
As of the census of 2010, there were 173 people, 75 households, and 50 families living in the city. The racial makeup of the city was 99.4% White and 0.6% Asian.

There were 75 households, of which 28.0% had children under the age of 18 living with them, 62.7% were married couples living together, 4.0% had a female householder with no husband present, and 33.3% were non-families. 30.7% of all households were made up of individuals, and 9.4% had someone living alone who was 65 years of age or older. The average household size was 2.31 and the average family size was 2.92.

The median age in the city was 44.5 years. 22.5% of residents were under the age of 18; 4.1% were between the ages of 18 and 24; 24.3% were from 25 to 44; 32.9% were from 45 to 64; and 16.2% were 65 years of age or older. The gender makeup of the city was 52.0% male and 48.0% female.

2000 census
As of the census of 2000, there were 148 people, 68 households, and 45 families living in the city. The racial makeup of the city was 100.00% White. Hispanic or Latino of any race were 1.35% of the population.

There were 68 households, out of which 27.9% had children under the age of 18 living with them, 55.9% were married couples living together, 8.8% had a female householder with no husband present, and 33.8% were non-families. 32.4% of all households were made up of individuals, and 13.2% had someone living alone who was 65 years of age or older. The average household size was 2.18 and the average family size was 2.76.

In the city, the population was spread out, with 24.3% under the age of 18, 7.4% from 18 to 24, 29.7% from 25 to 44, 25.0% from 45 to 64, and 13.5% who were 65 years of age or older. The median age was 38 years. For every 100 females, there were 100.0 males. For every 100 females age 18 and over, there were 86.7 males.

The median income for a household in the city was $30,750, and the median income for a family was $40,875. Males had a median income of $27,500 versus $22,500 for females. The per capita income for the city was $20,991. There were 4.4% of families and 6.4% of the population living below the poverty line, including no under eighteens and 16.7% of those over 64.

Education
South Hamilton Community School District serves this community.

References

External links
 History of Randall

Cities in Hamilton County, Iowa
Cities in Iowa